Ghost Bath is an American post-metal band from Minot, North Dakota, formed in 2012 and fronted by Dennis Mikula. They have released four studio albums and one EP to date, melding black metal and post-rock music. They initially gained notoriety for marketing themselves as being from China.

History
Originally the band claimed to have been from Chongqing, China. Their 2014 debut studio album Funeral was released on Chinese record label Pest Productions. They then signed to German label Northern Silence Productions for the release of their second album Moonlover in 2015. Upon gaining increased media attention, including critical acclaim from Pitchfork and Stereogum, the band was revealed to be from Minot, North Dakota and fronted by Dennis Mikula. When asked why the band did not correct the false reports on their origin, Mikula stated: "We refused to correct people because we do not wish to put actual faces onto our music. It is our wish as a band to connect to all human beings." In 2017, the band followed up Moonlover with Starmourner. In 2021, they announced Self Loather, the last album in the trilogy that began with Moonlover.

Musical style
Ghost Bath combine elements of black metal, including tremolo picking guitar play and shrieked vocals, with uplifting melodies and atmospheric qualities inspired by post-rock. Their style has thus been associated with blackgaze and post-metal and frequently compared to that of fellow American band Deafheaven, particularly on their breakthrough 2013 album Sunbather.

Discography

Studio albums
 Funeral (February 2014)
 Moonlover (April 2015)
 Starmourner (April 2017)
 Self Loather (October 2021)

EPs
 Ghost Bath (October 2013)

References

External links
  on Bandcamp
 
 

American black metal musical groups
Musical hoaxes
Musical groups established in 2012
Rock music groups from North Dakota
Musical quartets
Blackgaze musical groups
2012 establishments in North Dakota